Five Billion Years of Solitude: The Search for Life Among the Stars is a nonfiction work by the science author Lee Billings. The text was initially published on October 3, 2013 by Current. The paperback version was published on October 28, 2014.

Overview
In this book, Billings explores the scientists and science behind the ever-expanding universe of exoplanets.  Since the first detection of a planet orbiting another Sun-like star in 1995, scientists have discovered an increasing number of worlds beyond our solar system through detections by telescopes and spacecraft.  Billings reveals the scientists behind these discoveries and their thoughts on not only exoplanets, but also their triumphs and frustrations in their quest to solve one of the greatest mysteries of humankind: Are we alone?  Billings includes interviews with Frank Drake, Geoffrey Marcy, Greg Laughlin, James Kasting, Matt Mountain, Wesley Traub, Sara Seager, and many other prominent researchers.

Topics covered 
The book has 10 chapters:
 Looking for Longevity
 Drake's Orchids
 A Fractured Empire
 The Worth of a World
 After the Gold Rush
 The Big Picture
 Out of Equilibrium
 Aberrations of the Light
 The Order of the Null
 Into the Barren Lands

Reviews

See also
The Science of Interstellar

References

External links 
 for Five Billion Years of Solitude — Penguin Books website

2013 non-fiction books
Astronomy books
Popular science books